Spaklerweg is an Amsterdam Metro station in the industrial area Overamstel of Amsterdam, Netherlands. The station opened in 1982 and is served by 3 lines, the 51 (Amsterdam Centraal - Isolaterweg), 53 (Amsterdam Centraal - Gaasperplas) and 54 (Amsterdam Centraal - Gein).

The metro station is only accessible with an OV-chipkaart or GVB Travel Pass.

Change at this station between lines 51 and 53/54.

References

External links
GVB website 

Amsterdam Metro stations
Railway stations opened in 1982
1982 establishments in the Netherlands
Railway stations in the Netherlands opened in the 20th century